Lindi is a historic southern Tanzanian coastal small city and regional capital of the Lindi Region located at the far end of Lindi Bay, on the Indian Ocean in southeastern Tanzania. The town is part of Lindi Municipal District. Lindi is home to Lindi Historic Town, a national historic site of Tanzania.

History
Lindi Town was founded in the 11th century. There is no record of a previous name of the Swahili town, it was possibly named after one of the ancestors of local Mwinyi. In the 17th century location was later renamed by the Omani Arab colonizers as Lindi meaning "deep channel". 
The Omanis dominated local people and used the location as a port to sell and transport enslaved human beings and ivory to the global market. With the coming of the German occupation in the 19th century and later on the British occupation after World War I, the town was the administrative capital of the southern province until 1952 where it was moved to Mtwara City due to its favorable harbor potential in Lindi Bay. Ten years after independence in 1971 under the Nyerere administration made Lindi Town the regional seat for Lindi Region. However, the following year in 1972 due to socialism policy, urban councils were abolished in favor of rural development negatively affecting the economy of the town. In 1978 urban councils were reintroduced.

Economy
Lindi town's main economic activities are fishing, coconut, cashew nuts, roselles and salt production.
The town population was 78,841 as of the 2012 national census.

Geography 

Lindi Town is located at the mouth of the Lukuledi River. Located on Lindi Bay, its port facilities are still rudimentary, allowing one or two small cargo and passenger boats at a time, and cannot accommodate ocean-going ships. The region was once an important sisal-producing plantation area, especially in Kikwetu, surrounding the Lindi airstrip, 25 kilometers north of town. Around 2012 Lindi was finally linked to Dar es Salaam by a continuous tarmac road, making Lindi accessible throughout the rainy season. An older tarmac road connects Lindi Town to Mtwara City, passing through Mikindani, an important historic Swahili settlement in Mtwara Region. The Rondo Forest Reserve is an important site of biodiversity which is located at the Rondo Plateau, located in southern Lindi Region.

See also
List of Swahili settlements of the East African coast

References 

Swahili people
Swahili city-states
Swahili culture
 
Regional capitals in Tanzania
Populated places in Lindi Region
Populated coastal places in Tanzania